Hobkirk is a village and civil parish in the Scottish Borders area of Scotland, by the Rule Water, south-west of Jedburgh and south-east of Hawick.

Other places nearby include Abbotrule, Bonchester Bridge, Camptown, Hallrule, Bedrule, Southdean, Denholm, Rubers Law, and the Wauchope Forest.

Hobkirk was sometimes known as "Hopekirk". Part of the parish of Abbotrule was annexed to Hobkirk in 1777. The present parish church was built in 1869.

Robert Elliott (1762–1810) was born in Hobkirk and emigrated to Louiseville, Quebec. His great-great granddaughter was Grace Elliott (1890–1973), mother of 15th Canadian Prime Minister Pierre Elliott Trudeau (1919–2000) and paternal grandmother of 23rd Canadian Prime Minister Justin Trudeau (b. 1971).

Gallery

See also
List of places in the Scottish Borders
List of places in Scotland

References

External links

RCAHMS record for Hobkirk Parish
Gazetteer for Scotland: Map of the Parish of Hobkirk
Old Roads of Scotland: Hobkirk to Carter Bar
GENUKI: Hobkirk, formerly Hopekirk
Hobkirk Church of Scotland
Parish of Hobkirk and Southdean with Rubers Law

Villages in the Scottish Borders
Parishes in Roxburghshire